Stratford Town Football Club is a football club representing the town of Stratford upon Avon, Warwickshire, England, but currently based in nearby Tiddington.

History
The club was formed in 1941 as Stratford Rangers, changing their name in 1949.  After playing in various local leagues they joined the Worcestershire Combination (which later became the Midland Football Combination) in 1954.  In 1957 they switched to the Birmingham and District League, which became the West Midlands (Regional) League in 1962, but rejoined the Combination in 1970.  In 1975 they took the unusual step of joining the Hellenic League, which does not normally include teams from Warwickshire.  After two unsuccessful seasons they rejoined the Midland Combination once again, where they remained until becoming founder members of the Midland Football Alliance in 1994.

The club entered financial difficulty in 1998 and were reformed to become Stratford Town F.C.

On 20 April 2013, a 1–1 draw with Stourport Swifts sealed the Midland Alliance title and promotion to the Southern Football League for the first time in the club's history, where they initially played in Division One South & West.  After two seasons in the Division One South & West, Stratford Town earned promotion to the Premier Division via the play-offs with a 3–2 win against Larkhall Athletic on 4 May 2015. They successfully retained their status the following season.

The 2021–22 season saw The Bards reach the first round proper of the FA Cup for the first time in their history, defeating National League North side Boston United 3–2 in a fourth qualifying round replay after an initial 1–1 draw at the Boston Community Stadium. Stratford were drawn at home to League One side Shrewsbury Town, with the match televised on ITV4. Despite scoring first, they were eventually defeated 5–1 in front of a sell-out 2,800 spectators at Knights Lane.

Stadium
Stratford Town moved into the Knights Lane ground, Tiddington in the 2007–08 season.  They played their first league match there against Barwell on 16 February 2008, losing 1–0 to a Stuart Spencer goal.

The record attendance is 2,800 for the FA Cup first round match against Shrewsbury Town on 7 November 2021.

Players

Current squad
 

The Southern Football League does not use a squad numbering system.

Management and coaching staff

Boardroom

Current staff

Managerial history

See also
Stratford Town F.C. players
Stratford Town F.C. managers

References

External links
Official website

Southern Football League clubs
Midland Football Alliance
Association football clubs established in 1941
Football clubs in Warwickshire
1941 establishments in England
Football clubs in England
Stratford-upon-Avon